Homalota is a genus of rove beetles in the family Staphylinidae. There are more than 80 described species in Homalota.

Species
These 86 species belong to the genus Homalota:

 Epipeda angusticeps Sharp, 1883
 Epipeda brevicornis Sharp, 1883
 Epipeda debilis Sharp, 1883
 Epipeda delicatula Sharp, 1883
 Epipeda discedens Sharp, 1883
 Epipeda linearis Sharp, 1883
 Epipeda longiceps Sharp, 1883
 Epipeda longula Sharp, 1883
 Epipeda minor Sharp, 1883
 Epipeda minuta Sharp, 1883
 Epipeda pumila Sharp, 1883
 Epipeda puncticeps Sharp, 1883
 Epipeda reyi Sharp, 1883
 Epipeda sordida Sharp, 1883
 Homalota alticola Sharp, 1883
 Homalota annulata Sharp, 1883
 Homalota basiventris Sharp, 1883
 Homalota brevis Sharp, 1876
 Homalota capta Sharp, 1876
 Homalota carinata Sharp, 1883
 Homalota centralis Sharp, 1883
 Homalota certata Sharp, 1883
 Homalota championi Sharp, 1883
 Homalota chiriquensis Sharp, 1883
 Homalota cingulifera Sharp, 1883
 Homalota cognata Sharp, 1883
 Homalota colorata Sharp, 1883
 Homalota consimilis Sharp, 1883
 Homalota consors Sharp, 1883
 Homalota culpa Sharp, 1876
 Homalota debilis (Sharp, 1883)
 Homalota depressiuscula Mannerheim, 1831
 Homalota despecta Sharp, 1883
 Homalota diffinis Sharp, 1883
 Homalota difformis Mulsant & Rey, 1853
 Homalota discrepans Sharp, 1883
 Homalota dissimilis Sharp, 1883
 Homalota evanescens Sharp, 1883
 Homalota flavicauda Sharp, 1883
 Homalota flexibilis Casey, 1911
 Homalota fraterna (Sharp, 1888)
 Homalota frigidula Casey, 1911
 Homalota funesta Casey, 1911
 Homalota gilva Sharp, 1876
 Homalota godmani Sharp, 1883
 Homalota guatemalae Sharp, 1883
 Homalota hesperica Casey, 1911
 Homalota heterocera Sharp, 1883
 Homalota hirtiventris Sharp, 1883
 Homalota humilis Casey, 1911
 Homalota jugicola Sharp, 1883
 Homalota laeticula Sharp, 1883
 Homalota lepidula Casey, 1911
 Homalota leucoptera Sharp, 1883
 Homalota libera Sharp, 1883
 Homalota longifrons Sharp, 1883
 Homalota megacephala Fauvel, 1867
 Homalota mikado Likovsky, 1984
 Homalota moesta Mäklin, 1852
 Homalota mollis Sharp, 1883
 Homalota montium Sharp, 1883
 Homalota mundula Sharp, 1883
 Homalota nitens Mäklin, 1852
 Homalota opacicollis (Bernhauer, 1907)
 Homalota pectoralis Sharp, 1883
 Homalota perdita Sharp, 1883
 Homalota plana (Gyllenhal, 1810)
 Homalota prolixa Sharp, 1883
 Homalota pumila Sharp, 1883
 Homalota quaesticula Sharp, 1883
 Homalota recisa Scudder, 1890
 Homalota rufiventris Sharp, 1883
 Homalota sallaei Sharp, 1883
 Homalota sauteri Bernhauer, 1907
 Homalota semiobscura Sharp, 1883
 Homalota serrata Assing
 Homalota sobrina Sharp, 1883
 Homalota spergula Sharp, 1883
 Homalota tenax Sharp, 1876
 Homalota terminicornis Sharp, 1883
 Homalota thoracica Sharp, 1883
 Homalota traili Sharp, 1876
 Homalota trisignata Sharp, 1883
 Homalota tristicula Mulsant & Rey, 1873
 Homalota vexata Sharp, 1883
 Homalota wickhami Casey, 1911

References

Further reading

 
 
 

Aleocharinae
Articles created by Qbugbot